The St. Mary of the Angels Church and Monastery is a Roman Catholic parish located in Green Bay, Wisconsin, in the Diocese of Green Bay.

Description
The church is two stories tall and largely made of stone. Attached to the north side of the church is the monastery wing. It was added to the State Register of Historic Places in 2018 and to the National Register of Historic Places in 2019.

History
Sebastian Messmer, Bishop of Green Bay, acquired the property of the former St. Stanislaus Kostka Church in 1898 and rededicated it to St. Mary of Czestochowa, intending it to serve the Polish American population of Green Bay. The following year, he offered it to the Polish Franciscan Fathers of Pulaski, who rededicated the church and monastery to St. Mary of the Angels in 1900, after the church in Assisi.

References

Churches on the National Register of Historic Places in Wisconsin
Buildings and structures in Green Bay, Wisconsin
Churches in the Roman Catholic Diocese of Green Bay
Churches in Brown County, Wisconsin
Franciscan churches in the United States
Roman Catholic churches completed in 1903
20th-century Roman Catholic church buildings in the United States
Religious organizations established in 1898
1898 establishments in Wisconsin
Gothic Revival church buildings in Wisconsin
Franciscan monasteries in the United States
Stone buildings in the United States
National Register of Historic Places in Brown County, Wisconsin